Japan Association for the 2005 World Exposition is the association which held Expo 2005 in Japan.

Outline
Foundation: October 23, 1997
Office: Nagoya, Japan
Honorary president: Naruhito, Crown Prince of Japan
President: Shoichiro Toyoda (honorary president of Toyota Motor Corporation(TMC), the 6th president of TMC, director of Global Industrial and Social Progress Research Institute(GISPRI), a Japanese think tank)
Secretary General: Toshio Nakamura (director of GISPRI)
Dissolution: December 31, 2006

The association's tasks were succeeded by Global Industrial and Social Progress Research Institute (GISPRI) from March, 2007.

External links
Japan Association for the 2005 World Exposition
Expo 2005
Global Industrial and Social Progress Research Institute(GISPRI)

Aichi Prefecture
World's fairs in Nagoya
1997 establishments in Japan
2006 disestablishments in Japan
Organizations established in 1997
Organizations disestablished in 2006